Maria Dyatchkova is a Russian former football defender, who played for Zvezda Perm in the Russian Championship. She has won five championships with CSK VVS Samara, Rossiyanka and Zvezda.

She was a member of the Russian national team, but missed the 2009 European Championship due to an injury.

Titles
 5 Russian Championships (2001, 2005, 2006, 2008, 2009)
 2 Russian Cups (2005, 2006)

References

1982 births
Living people
Russian women's footballers
Footballers from Moscow
Russia women's international footballers
Zvezda 2005 Perm players
Women's association football defenders
WFC Rossiyanka players
CSK VVS Samara (women's football club) players
Russian Women's Football Championship players
21st-century Russian women